Joel Antônio Martins (23 November 1931 – 1 January 2003), known as just Joel, was an association football winger.

Biography
Joel was born 23 November 1931 in Rio de Janeiro. His football career began when he was discovered by Botafogo in 1948, at the age of 17 years. Two years later, however, he moved to Flamengo where he won the Rio State Championship for three times in a row (1953, 1954, 1955).

Joel had caps for Brazil between 1957 and 1961. He was in the starting line-up on the first two matches of 1958 FIFA World Cup, but then he went to the bench replaced by Garrincha, just like his Flamengo's teammate Dida was replaced by Pelé.

Honours
1958 FIFA World Cup Champion
Rio State Championship 1953, 1954, 1955
Rio-São Paulo Tournament 1961

References

External links
Profile at cbf.com.br
 Profile  

1931 births
2003 deaths
Brazilian footballers
Brazilian expatriate footballers
Brazil international footballers
Botafogo de Futebol e Regatas players
Esporte Clube Vitória players
CR Flamengo footballers
Valencia CF players
1958 FIFA World Cup players
FIFA World Cup-winning players
Association football midfielders
Brazilian expatriate sportspeople in Spain
Expatriate footballers in Spain
La Liga players
Footballers from Rio de Janeiro (city)